Carlos Navarro may refer to:

 Carlos Navarro (taekwondo) (born 1996), Mexican taekwondo practitioner
 Carlos Navarro Montoya (born 1966), Colombian footballer
 Carlos Arias Navarro (1908–1989), Spanish politician
 Carlos Navarro (actor) (born 1980), American actor and radio personality

See also
 Juan Carlos Navarro (disambiguation)